The 1975 Arkansas State Indians football team represented Arkansas State University as a member of the Southland Conference during the 1975 NCAA Division I football season. Led by fifth-year head coach Bill Davidson, the Indians compiled an overall record of 11–0 with a mark of 5–0 in conference play, winning the Southland title.

Schedule

References

Arkansas State
Arkansas State Red Wolves football seasons
Southland Conference football champion seasons
College football undefeated seasons
Arkansas State Indians football